The 2018 Albanian Supercup was the 25th edition of the Albanian Supercup, an annual Albanian football match. The teams were decided by taking the winner of the previous season's Albanian Superliga and the runner-up of the Albanian Cup.

The match was contested by Skënderbeu, champions of the 2017–18 Albanian Superliga, and Laçi, the 2017–18 Albanian Cup runner-up. The match was held at Selman Stërmasi Stadium in Tirana for the third consecutive year.

Details

See also

2017–18 Albanian Superliga
2017–18 Albanian Cup

References

2018
Supercup
Albanian Supercup, 2018
Albanian Supercup, 2018